Willia Menzel (5 February 1907 – 1995) was a Belgian artist, primarily a sculptor and graphic designer, associated with the La Cambre group of artists and Cubism. She submitted a work in the Paintings, Drawings and Watercolours section as part of the art competition at the 1928 Summer Olympics.

References

Further reading
 
Peter J.H. Pauwels, 2018: Pauwels, Huib Hoste en zijn tijdgenoten. Belgische Avant-Garde 1914-1930, pp. 196-197. Knokke, Gallery Ronny Van de Velde/Delen Private Bank

1907 births
1955 deaths
20th-century Belgian sculptors
Belgian women sculptors
Olympic competitors in art competitions
Place of birth missing